Jarilinus is an extinct genus of chroniosuchid reptiliomorph from upper Permian (upper Tatarian age) deposits of Novgorod and Orenburg Region, Russia. It was first named by V. K. Golubev in 1998, from skull fragments and trunk scutes. The type species is Jarilinus mirabilis.

References

Permian tetrapods
Fossil taxa described in 1998
Chroniosuchians
Permian animals of Europe
Permian animals of Asia